Ophidiophobia (or ophiophobia) is a particular type of specific phobia, the irrational fear of snakes. It is sometimes called by a more general term, herpetophobia, fear of reptiles. The word comes from the Greek words "ophis", snake, and "phobia" meaning fear.

Research

About a third of adult humans are ophidiophobic, making this one of the most commonly reported phobias.

In The Handbook of the Emotions (1993), psychologist Arne Öhman studied pairing an unconditioned stimulus with evolutionarily-relevant fear-response neutral stimuli (snakes and spiders) versus evolutionarily-irrelevant fear-response neutral stimuli (mushrooms, flowers, physical representation of polyhedra, firearms, and electrical outlets) on human subjects and found that ophidiophobia and arachnophobia required only one pairing to develop a conditioned response while mycophobia, anthophobia, phobias of physical representations of polyhedra, firearms, and electrical outlets required multiple pairings and went extinct without continued conditioning while the conditioned ophidiophobia and arachnophobia were permanent. Similarly, psychologists Susan Mineka, Richard Keir, and Veda Price found that laboratory-raised rhesus macaques did not display fear if required to reach across a toy snake to receive a banana unless the macaque was shown a video of another macaque withdrawing in fright from the toy (which produced a permanent fear-response), while being shown a similar video of another macaque displaying fear of a flower produced no similar response. 

Psychologist Paul Ekman cites the following anecdote recounted by Charles Darwin in The Expression of the Emotions in Man and Animals (1872) in connection with Öhman's research:

Psychiatrist Randolph M. Nesse notes that while conditioned fear responses to evolutionarily novel dangerous objects such as electrical outlets is possible, the conditioning is slower because such cues have no prewired connection to fear, noting further that despite the emphasis of the risks of speeding and drunk driving in driver's education, it alone does not provide reliable protection against traffic collisions and that nearly one-quarter of all deaths in 2014 of people aged 15 to 24 in the United States were in traffic collisions. Additionally, Nesse, psychiatrist Isaac Marks, and evolutionary biologist George C. Williams have noted that people with systematically deficient responses to various adaptive phobias (e.g. ophidiophobia, arachnophobia, basophobia) are more temperamentally careless and more likely to receive unintentional injuries that are potentially fatal and have proposed that such deficient phobia should be classified as "hypophobia" due to its selfish genetic consequences.

A 2001 study at the Karolinska Institute in Sweden suggested that mammals may have an innate negative reaction to snakes (and spiders), which was vital for their survival as it allowed such threats to be identified immediately. 
A 2009 report of a 40-year research program demonstrated strong fear conditioning to snakes in humans and fast nonconscious processing of snake images; these are mediated by a fear network in the human brain involving the amygdala.
A 2013 study provided neurobiological evidence in primates (macaques) of natural selection for detecting snakes rapidly.

In fiction
In non-medical press and literature, the movie-character Indiana Jones has been used as an example of someone with ophidiophobia.

References 

Zoophobias
Snakes